Polymorphus minutus is a species of Acanthocephala in the family Polymorphidae. They can grow up to 12.5 mm. It is an economically significant parasite in goose and duck farming.

References

Parasites
Polymorphidae
Acanthocephalans
Taxa named by Johann August Ephraim Goeze
Animals described in 1782